is a Japanese footballer.

Club career
After returning from his spell with Albirex Niigata Singapore, Yazawa continued to play football in the lower leagues of Japan.

Career statistics

Club

Notes

References

1997 births
Living people
Sportspeople from Nagano Prefecture
Association football people from Nagano Prefecture
Japanese footballers
Japanese expatriate footballers
Association football defenders
Singapore Premier League players
Japan Soccer College players
Albirex Niigata Singapore FC players
Japanese expatriate sportspeople in Singapore
Expatriate footballers in Singapore